Erik Bjørkum (born 26 February 1965) is a Norwegian sailor and Olympic medallist, born in Sandefjord. He received a silver medal in the Flying Dutchman class at the 1988 Summer Olympics in Seoul, together with Ole Petter Pollen. Bjørkum and Pollen won a silver medal at the 1988 European Championships, and a bronze medal at the 1989 Flying Dutchman World Championship.

Bjørkum resides at Høvik.

References

External links
 
 
 

1965 births
Living people
Norwegian male sailors (sport)
Olympic sailors of Norway
Olympic silver medalists for Norway
Olympic medalists in sailing
Sailors at the 1988 Summer Olympics – Flying Dutchman
Medalists at the 1988 Summer Olympics
Sportspeople from Bærum
People from Sandefjord